WPVL may refer to:

 WPVL (AM), a radio station (1590 AM) licensed to Platteville, Wisconsin, United States
 WPVL-FM, a radio station (107.1 FM) licensed to Platteville, Wisconsin, United States